Thomas Bennett Curtis House is a historic home located at Starkey in Yates County, New York. It is a Gothic Revival style structure built about 1851.

It was listed on the National Register of Historic Places in 1994.

References

Houses on the National Register of Historic Places in New York (state)
Houses completed in 1851
Gothic Revival architecture in New York (state)
Houses in Yates County, New York
1851 establishments in New York (state)
National Register of Historic Places in Yates County, New York